The Imploding the Mirage Tour is the ongoing sixth major concert tour by American rock band The Killers. The tour supports their sixth and seventh studio albums Imploding the Mirage (2020) and Pressure Machine (2021). The tour began at the Terminal 5 in New York City on August 19, 2021, and is scheduled to conclude at Stradbally Hall in County Laois on September 3, 2023.

Set list
This setlist is representative of the show on May 24, 2022 in Doncaster. It is not intended to represent all shows from the tour.

 "My Own Soul's Warning"
 "Enterlude"
 "When You Were Young"
 "Jenny Was a Friend of Mine"
 "Smile Like You Mean It"
 "Shot at the Night"
 "Blowback"
 "Running Towards a Place"
 "Mr. Brightside"
 "Somebody Told Me"
 "Fire in Bone"
 "Shadowplay"
 "Run for Cover"
 "Runaway Horses"
 "A Dustland Fairytale"
 "The First Time Ever I Saw Your Face" 
 "Runaways"
 "Read My Mind"
 "Dying Breed" 
 "Caution"
Encore
  "Spaceman"
 "Human"
 "Midnight Show"
 "All These Things That I've Done"

Tour dates

Cancelled shows

Personnel 
Credits adapted from LasVegasRoundTheClock and Consequence of Sound

The Killers 
 Brandon Flowers - lead vocals, keyboard, piano, bass
 Dave Keuning - lead guitar, background vocals (did not appear on May 17 - June 22, returned to the tour on July 2 in Gdynia, Poland)
 Ronnie Vannucci Jr. - drums, percussion

Additional Musicians 
 Ted Sablay - rhythm guitar, lead guitar (May 17 - June 22)
 Jake Blanton - bass
 Taylor Milne - rhythm guitar
 Robbie Connolly - keyboard, rhythm guitar
 Erica Canales - background vocals
 Melissa Mcmillan - background vocals
 Tori Allen - background vocals, violin, rhythm guitar

Notes

References

2021 concert tours
2022 concert tours
The Killers concert tours
Concert tours of North America
Concert tours of the United States
Concert tours of Canada
Concert tours of Mexico
Concert tours of Europe
Concert tours of the United Kingdom
Concert tours of France
Concert tours of Germany
Concert tours of Ireland
Concert tours of Oceania
Concert tours of Australia
Concert tours of New Zealand
2023 concert tours